Hofheim may refer to one of these cities in Germany:
Hofheim, Hesse (Hofheim am Taunus)
Hofheim, Bavaria (Hofheim in Unterfranken)